Colm Ó Lochlainn (1892 – 26 June 1972) was a printer, typographer, collector of Irish ballads and traditional Irish Uilleann piper. He was notably the author of Irish Street Ballads published in 1939 and More Irish Street Ballads in 1965.

Life
A native of Kilkenny, Ó Lochlainn was a member of the Irish volunteers in 1916. He was part of a team which was sent to Kerry on Good Friday in a bid to seize radio equipment for communication with The Aud, a German ship transporting arms from Germany for the Easter Rising. He and a colleague, Denis Daly made it to their destination but a second car transporting three others crashed into the river at Ballykissane, Killorglin, killing three members of the team, Con Keating, Donal Sheehan and Charlie Monaghan.

Ó Lochlainn established the Candle Press in 1916. It was the winner of a bronze medal for bookbinding in 1924.

He founded his own press, At the Sign of the Three Candles Press, in 1926. He gave the aspiring piper Seamus Ennis his first job at this press, and Ennis collaborated with him on the Irish Street Ballads books. He succeeded Seamus Ó Casaide as volunteer editor of Irish Book Lover in 1930.

He was an assistant in the Faculty of Modern Irish at University College Dublin from 1933 to 1943, where he later became professor of Irish Language and Literature. He was also associated with the founding of An Óige.

About 1940 he began the publication in Dublin of an undated series of penny Irish-language songsheets entitled An Claisceadal ("choral singing").  This was originally the name of an informal choral group of Irish-language enthusiasts which had been brought together in Dublin in 1928.

He died in a nursing home in Dublin in June 1972 and was buried in Glasnevin Cemetery.

Family
Seamus Ennis was godfather to Colm's son Ruan, a renowned musician who played with Bees Make Honey and recorded with artists such as Bryan Ferry, Link Wray and who was a founding member of Ronnie Lane's Slim Chance. His other son Dara played jazz with the Chicago Jazz Seven. His daughter Aifric is an art therapist and artist. His grandson Fionn Ó Lochlainn is also a critically acclaimed recording artist0 and musician, taking credit for the socially handicapped brother, Oscar,8 1 who played in Dónal Lunny's 'Coolfin'.

Selected publications
 A Printer's Device, in The Irish Book Lover, Jan. & Feb. 1928
 The Printer on Gaelic Printing, Irish Book Lover vol. XVI, July–Dec. 1928
 Roadways in Ancient Ireland, in Feil-Sgribhinn Eoin MacNeill, 1940
 The Devil's Puzzle: A Survey of Men's Notions of Man, Robert Gregg Bury, 1949.
 Anglo-Irish Songwriters, 3 Candles, 1958
Irish Street Ballads, Three Candles Press, 1939/1952; Irish Book Centre, 1962,
More Irish Street Ballads, Three Candles Press, Dublin 1965,

See also
Traditional Irish Singers

References

Further reading
 Irish Type Design: A History of Printing Types in the Irish Character, Dermot McGuinne, Irish Academic Press, 1992
 The Three Candles Press: A Catalogue, Eamonn de Burca, Dublin, 1998
 Decolonisation and Criticism: The Construction of Irish Literature, Gerry Smyth, London, Pluto Press, 1998

External links
 List of the songs that appear on Irish Street Ballads
 Colm Ó Lochlainn Ballads. A UCD Digital Library Collection.
 Font Designer – Colm O'Lochlainn/Dara O'Lochlainn
 Colum Cille and Irish Gaelic type

Irish folk singers
1892 births
1972 deaths
Irish uilleann pipers
Irish folk-song collectors
Irish printers
Irish typographers and type designers
Musicians from County Kilkenny
20th-century Irish male singers
20th-century musicologists